Atinus is a genus of ant-loving beetles in the family Staphylinidae. There are at least two described species in Atinus.

Species
These two species belong to the genus Atinus:
 Atinus brevicornis Casey, 1894
 Atinus monilicornis (Brendel, 1866)

References

Further reading

 
 

Pselaphitae
Articles created by Qbugbot